Gasparo Locatello (c. 15501625) was an Italian composer and canon at Saint Mark's in Venice.

References

Renaissance composers
1550 births
1625 deaths
Italian male classical composers
Italian classical composers